The Lycée Paul-Gauguin (LPG) is a secondary school in Papeete, Tahiti.

The school originated from the École Centrale, which became the collège Paul Gauguin on 10 August 1953. At the time it had 478 students. It became the lycée Paul Gauguin on 15 November 1960.

References

External links
 Lycée Paul-Gauguin 
 Entry at the French Ministry of Education 

Secondary schools in France
Tahiti